Outpost is an album by the Boulder, Colorado-based band the Samples, released in 1996. The first single was "The Lost Children (A Slow Motion Crash)". The band promoted Outpost by playing the H.O.R.D.E. Festival.

The album sold around 58,000 copies in its first two years of release. The band briefly broke up after promoting the album, before reforming with a different lineup.

Production
The Samples were able to spend two years working on the album, due to label negotiations. Outpost includes re-recordings of two older songs, as well as a re-recording of a Sean Kelly song; it also contains an unlisted live track.

Critical reception

The Washington Post wrote that "the Samples' music is still a bit blank, but it's consistently tuneful and mostly lively." The Hartford Courant noted that "the music is almost devoid of musical hooks, relying instead on [Sean] Kelly's vocals, background harmonies and pleasant arrangements among guitar, bass and keyboards to hold the listener's interest."

The Indianapolis Star stated: "From the dreamy, melancholy 'I Remember Dying' to the high-energy delivery of 'All My Thoughts (I Remember Johnny)', the Samples' Output ... reminds of a pre-Top 40 Fleetwood Mac." The Republican determined that "this is provocative stuff, at times reminiscent of everyone from the Police in their prime to early BoDeans and R.E.M."

Track listing
All songs written by Sean Kelly, except where noted.
 "Anyone" (Kelly, Andy Sheldon, Al Laughlin, Jeep MacNichol)
 "Did You Ever Look So Nice" 
 "Learjet" 
 "Shine On"
 "Big Bird" (MacNichol)
 "Indiana" 
 "Birth of Words" 
 "It's Curtains" (Sheldon) 
 "The Lost Children (A Slow Motion Crash)"
 "Foreign Countries" (Kelly, Laughlin) 
 "Information" (Kelly, Sheldon) 
 "All My Thoughts (Johnny Station Wagon)" (Sheldon) 
 "I Remember Dying" (Kelly, Sheldon)

Lineup
 Sean Kelly (Lead Singer, Guitar, Harmonica, Keyboards)
 Andy Sheldon (Bass, Guitar, Vocals)
 Al Laughlin (Keyboards)
 Jeep MacNichol (Drums, Percussion, Guitar, Vocals)
 Greg Leisz (Slide Guitar)
 Eric Caudieux (Keyboard Programming, Drum Programming)
 Walt Beery (Guitar, Background Vocals)

References

The Samples albums
1996 albums
MCA Records albums